Princess Milica Petrović-Njegoš of Montenegro, also known as Grand Duchess Militza Nikolaevna of Russia, (14 July 1866 – 5 September 1951) was a Montenegrin princess. She was the daughter of King Nikola I Petrović-Njegoš of Montenegro and Milena Vukotić. Milica was the wife of Grand Duke Peter Nikolaevich of Russia, the younger brother of Grand Duke Nicholas Nikolaevich of Russia, whose wife was Milica's sister, Anastasia.

Life

Milica and her sister, Anastasia, were invited by Alexander III of Russia to be educated at the Russian Smolny Institute, which was a school for "noble maids".

Grand Duke Peter Nikolaevich of Russia and Princess Milica were married on 26 July 1889 in Saint Petersburg. She was the first princess to marry in to the Imperial family who was already an Orthodox and did not need to convert in order to marry. She was described as well educated, intelligent and arrogant, and the opposite of her introverted spouse. Milica was an honorary doctor on alchemy in Paris.

Both sisters were socially influential at the Russian Imperial Court. Milica and Anastasia were both ambitious on behalf of their husbands, and attempted to gain influence with the Empress and through her on the Emperor. Their machinations were reviled by most imperial family members and the rest of the royal court. Nicknamed jointly "The Black Peril”, “The Crows”, and “The Cockroaches” the sisters were both observant Russian Orthodox Christians and deeply interested in the occult. They introduced the Imperial Family to the mystic Philippe Nizier-Vashod (usually referred to merely as "Monsieur Philippe") and then to strannik Grigori Rasputin.  In 1909 however, the sisters lost their influence with the Empress.

Milica and her spouse spent a lot of time abroad because of Peter's fragile health. During the First World War, they lived in the Crimea. From Yalta in the Crimea, Anastasia and her husband escaped Russia in 1919 aboard a British battleship, HMS Marlborough. They settled in Italy, living with her sister Elena, Queen of Italy and when the Italian monarchy was abolished in 1947 she left for Egypt.

Children
Grand Duke Peter Nikolaevich of Russia and Princess Milica were married on 26 July 1889 in Saint Petersburg. The couple had four children:

Princess Marina Petrovna of Russia (1892–1981).
Prince Roman Petrovich of Russia (1896–1978).
Princess Nadejda Petrovna of Russia (1898–1988).
Princess Sofia Petrovna of Russia (3 March 1898 – 3 March 1898); buried in the convent cemetery in Kyiv by her grandmother, Grand Duchess Alexandra Petrovna, who was a nun there.

References

External links
The Njegoskij Fund Public Project: Private family archives-based digital documentary fund focused on history and culture of Royal Montenegro.

1866 births
1951 deaths
20th-century Montenegrin people
Petrović-Njegoš dynasty
People from Cetinje
Montenegrin princesses
Russian grand duchesses by marriage
20th-century Russian people
Emigrants from the Russian Empire to Egypt
20th-century Montenegrin women
Daughters of kings